WBYP (107.1 FM) is a radio station broadcasting a country music format. Licensed to Belzoni, Mississippi, United States.  The station is currently owned by Zoo-Bel Broadcasting, LLC.

References

External links

Country radio stations in the United States
BYP